John William Middendorf II (born September 22, 1924) is a former Republican United States diplomat and Secretary of the Navy.

Education and military service 

John William Middendorf II received a Bachelor of Naval Science (BNS) degree from College of the Holy Cross in 1945. 

In World War II, he served in the United States Navy from 1944 to 1946 as engineer officer and navigator aboard USS LCS(L) 53.  He was discharged from the Navy in 1946.

He earned a BA degree from Harvard College in 1947, where he was a member of the Hasty Pudding Theatricals and the Owl Club. He also graduated from New York University's Graduate School of Business Administration, receiving an MBA degree in 1954.

Early career 
He became an investment banker and in 1963 in partnership with Austen Colgate formed his own company, Middendorf, Colgate and Company (with a seat on the New York Stock Exchange). An early member of Barry Goldwater's presidential campaign, he served as treasurer of that campaign, and continued to have the same duties with the Republican National Committee from 1965–1969.

Government service

Shortly after taking office in 1969, President Richard Nixon appointed Middendorf as United States Ambassador to the Netherlands. Middendorf served in this position until June 1973. 

After returning to the U.S., he became Under Secretary of the Navy; not long after, Secretary John Warner moved on to become head of the Bicentennial Commission, and Middendorf was told he could expect promotion to Secretary. However, when his nomination seemed to be stalled, he discovered that Secretary of Defense James Schlesinger had a candidate of his own (information that Schlesinger had not shared with Middendorf). Whereupon, Middendorf paid a personal call on many of the senators he had worked with while he was Treasurer of the Republican Party—and soon enough he had been nominated and confirmed as Secretary of the Navy, serving until the end of the administration of President Gerald Ford. As he would later write, "Life is relationships. Politics is compromise."
         
During his tenure and again using his legislative contacts, Middendorf helped increase the Navy budget by 60 percent while the U.S. Army and U.S. Air Force budgets remained relatively flat. Programs he championed included the Ohio-class submarine and the companion Trident missile, the Aegis surface-launched missile system (which became the Navy's longest-running construction program; the 100th Aegis-equipped ship was delivered to the U.S. Navy in 2009 and systems are now in service with five allied navies). He also championed the F/A-18 Hornet carrier-based fighter attack aircraft—which Middendorf  arranged to have dubbed "Hornet," as a tribute to his Revolutionary War ancestor merchant-shipping Captain William Stone, who donated two ships to the fledgling Navy which were then renamed "Wasp" and "Hornet." Those names survived many years and many ships, but as the fleet began to shrink and as ship-naming became more political—i.e., breaking the old rules and naming ships after living politicians—there weren't enough new candidates for traditional names.

Incoming President Jimmy Carter invited Middendorf to stay on as Secretary of the Navy; however, as Middendorf  noted in his 2011 memoir Potomac Fever, he told the President-elect "that it was the best job in government and therefore an insecure post for a Republican in a Democrat administration." During the Carter presidency, Middendorf was back in the private sector, as President and Chief Executive Officer of Financial General Bankshares (which he re-organized and renamed First American Bank). Next, he headed the CIA transition team (1980) for incoming President Ronald Reagan and was then named Permanent Representative of the United States of America to the Organization of American States (OAS), with the rank of Ambassador. He served in the post until 1984, when he accepted appointment as U. S. Representative to the European Community (known today as the European Union) serving until 1987.

Other pursuits and interests
In 2006, Middendorf published a book describing his work with the Goldwater campaign.  Glorious Disaster: Barry Goldwater's Presidential Campaign and the Origins of the Conservative Movement details how Goldwater's campaign became the foundation of the modern Conservative movement.

In 2011, he published his autobiography, Potomac Fever.

He is a prolific composer of symphonies (including the Holland Symphony, presented to Queen Juliana of the Netherlands on the 25th anniversary of her ascension to the throne) and 100 marches for ships of the U.S. Navy.

Ambassador Middendorf is a member of the board of directors of the International Republican Institute.  He is a member of the board of trustees for the Heritage Foundation, an influential Washington, D.C. based public policy research institute.

He is also a member of the Rhode Island Society of the Sons of the Revolution and the Naval Order of the United States.

Middendorf studied stained glass production with Dutch-born expert Joep Nicolas. He is on the board of the New York Studio School of Drawing, Painting and Sculpture.

Honors and awards

Decorations and medals from the United States Government
 Superior Honor Award, U.S. Department of State, 1974
 Department of Defense Medal for Distinguished Public Service, 1975; bronze palm (second award), 1976
 Navy Distinguished Public Service Award, 1976
 American Campaign Medal
 Asiatic-Pacific Campaign Medal with two battle stars
 World War II Victory Medal
 Navy Occupation Medal with "ASIA" clasp
 China Service Medal

Foreign orders, decorations and medals
 Grand Officer of Order of Orange-Nassau, The Netherlands, 1985
 Order of the Arab Republic of Egypt – Rank A (highest foreign decoration) by President Sadat
 Grand Officer of the Order of Naval Merit – Republic of Brazil, 1974
 Naval Distinguished Service Medal, Brazil, 1976

Other awards
Middendorf has received the "Edwin Franko Goldman Award" from the American Bandmasters Association and is a member of the American Society of Composers and Performers (ASCAP).
Other honors include:
 Hudson River Museum Honoree, Hudson River Museum, 2009
 Maritime Security Lifetime Excellence Award, 2002
 Arleigh Burke Award – Navy League of the United States, 1998
 Ludwig von Mises Free Market Award – 1985
 Distinguished Service Award, Purdue University Band
 Gold Medal, The Netherlands Society of the Sons of American Revolution
 Medal of Honor, Midwest National Band and Orchestra Association
 Alumnus of the Year, New York University Graduate School of Business
 Association of Harvard Clubs of American Award (Music) (Keogh Award)
 NYU Eugene Keogh Award for Distinguished Public Service (1989)
 American Friends of Turkey Leadership Award, 1989
 Presidential Physical Fitness Award, 1990
 Distinguished Patriot Award, SAR of State of New York, 1975
 Award of Merit, Art League of Virginia (Portrait of Del), 1996
 U.S. Olympic Committee Gold Shield Award
 Gold Medal, Holland Society of New York, 1996
 American Bandmasters Association Edwin Franko Goldman Award
 American Music Award, Harvard Clubs

Honorary degrees
 Troy State University – Doctor of Law
 School of the Ozarks – Doctor of Letters
 American Christian College – Doctor of Letters
 Francisco Marroquin University – Doctor of Social Sciences

Bibliography

References

External links

 American paintings & historical prints from the Middendorf collection, an exhibition catalog from The Metropolitan Museum of Art (fully available online as PDF)
 
 Lars Larson Interview - Is the next Cold War on the horizon? (2020)
 The Daily Signal Book Review - "Great Nightfall Provides Extraordinary Overview of Military Challenges Facing America" (2020)

1924 births
Living people
The Heritage Foundation
Harvard College alumni
International Republican Institute
United States Secretaries of the Navy
College of the Holy Cross alumni
New York University Stern School of Business alumni
Hasty Pudding alumni
Permanent Representatives of the United States to the Organization of American States
Politicians from Baltimore
Military personnel from Baltimore
United States Under Secretaries of the Navy
Maryland Republicans
Recipients of the Order of Naval Merit (Brazil)
Rhode Island Republicans
New Right (United States)
Ford administration personnel
Nixon administration personnel
United States Navy personnel of World War II
United States Navy officers
20th-century American diplomats